Teleritmo (alternately known as TLR) is a network of Spanish language television stations primarily concentrated in northeastern Mexico and the southwestern United States. The system is part of Grupo Multimedios. The flagship station of Teleritmo is XHSAW-TDT located in Monterrey, Nuevo León. Programming features Mexican regional music and music appeal variety programming.

Teleritmo affiliates
The following is a list of Multimedios Television affiliates that broadcast Teleritmo on its third subchannel 6.3 in Mexico:

|-

|-

|-

|-

|-

|-

|-

|-

|-

|}

Pay TV availability 
Teleritmo is available across the United States on many cable, satellite and IPTV systems, including DirecTV, Dish/Sling, Comcast, Spectrum, AT&T U-Verse, Verizon FiOS and Grande Communications. It is carried in both standard definition and high definition versions. In 2016, the network also became available in Costa Rica (the third largest Mexican diaspora behind the United States and Guatemala) through cable.

References

External links 
 Multimedios
 Grupo Multimedios

 
Television networks in Mexico
Grupo Multimedios
Spanish-language television stations in Mexico
Spanish-language television networks in the United States
Mass media in Monterrey